is a Japanese professional wrestling referee and writer, as well as an occasional wrestler. He is famous for his career in New Japan Pro-Wrestling, where he was also known by his ring name Mr. Takahashi, and for his post-retirement writing work, where he gained controversy for his autobiographical statements and books detailing the inner side of the business.

Biography
After a decorated career in judo and powerlifting, Takahashi became a professional wrestler in Toshio Yamaguchi's trope in 1963. Later, in 1972, he joined New Japan Pro-Wrestling by mediation of his childhood friend Kotetsu Yamamoto. He worked mainly as a referee for the company, certified as such by National Wrestling Alliance, and acted too as a booker, a column writer and a producer for Asahi TV's World Pro Wrestling show. In 1990, Takahashi left his place and most of his functions to Tiger Hattori, and retired from professional wrestling eight years later. He became a physical education teacher and a writer.

Selected works

Non-fiction
 (1998)  
 (1998)  
 (2001)  
 (2002)  
 (2010)  
 (2018)

Fiction
 (2004)  
 (2005)  
 (2005)

References

New Japan Pro-Wrestling
Living people
1941 births
Professional wrestling referees
Professional wrestling executives
Professional wrestling writers
Japanese male professional wrestlers
Japanese novelists
Sportspeople from Kanagawa Prefecture
People from Yokohama